Choi Heung-chul (born December 3, 1981) is a South Korean ski jumper who has competed since 1997. Competing in six Winter Olympics, he earned his best finish of eighth in the team large hill event at Salt Lake City in 2002 and had his best individual finish of 30th in the individual normal hill event at those same games

Choi's best finishes at the FIS Nordic World Ski Championships was tenth in the team normal hill event at Oberstdorf in 2005 while his best individual finish was 24th in the individual normal hill event at Lahti four years earlier.

His best World Cup finish of eighth in the team large hill event at Japan in 2002 while his best individual finish was 15th in an individual large hill event at Finland three years earlier.

References

External links 
 
 

1981 births
Living people
South Korean male ski jumpers
Olympic ski jumpers of South Korea
Ski jumpers at the 1998 Winter Olympics
Ski jumpers at the 2002 Winter Olympics
Ski jumpers at the 2006 Winter Olympics
Ski jumpers at the 2010 Winter Olympics
Ski jumpers at the 2014 Winter Olympics
Ski jumpers at the 2018 Winter Olympics
Asian Games medalists in ski jumping
Ski jumpers at the 2003 Asian Winter Games
Ski jumpers at the 2011 Asian Winter Games
Ski jumpers at the 2017 Asian Winter Games
Medalists at the 2007 Winter Universiade
Asian Games gold medalists for South Korea
Asian Games bronze medalists for South Korea
Medalists at the 2003 Asian Winter Games
Medalists at the 2011 Asian Winter Games
Medalists at the 2017 Asian Winter Games
Universiade gold medalists for South Korea
Universiade silver medalists for South Korea
Universiade bronze medalists for South Korea
Universiade medalists in ski jumping
Competitors at the 2001 Winter Universiade
Medalists at the 2003 Winter Universiade
Competitors at the 2009 Winter Universiade